is a 2015 Japanese drama film based on the novel by Shino Sakuragi who won the Naoki Prize in 2013. The film's theme song is "Terminal" by My Little Lover. It was released on November 7, 2015.

Cast
 Kōichi Satō as Kanji Washida
 Tsubasa Honda as Atsuko Shīna
 Nakamura Shidō II as Ichiryū Ōshita
 Masato Wada as Takuji Moriyama
 Takuma Oto'o as Shinichi Ōmura
 Shigeru Izumiya as Tatsuzō Minami
 Machiko Ono as Saeko Yūki

Reception
The film grossed  on its opening weekend.

References

External links
  
 

2015 films
2010s Japanese films
2010s Japanese-language films
Films based on Japanese novels
Japanese drama films
Films directed by Tetsuo Shinohara
2015 drama films

ja:起終点駅 ターミナル#映画